The Chapel of St. Mary and St. Nathalan is a ruined chapel overlooking the North Sea immediately north of Stonehaven, in the Mearns of Scotland, along the northern shoreline of Stonehaven Bay. (Watt, 1985)  The founding of this Christian place of worship is associated with St. Nathalan. who lived circa 650 AD.  The structure is alternatively known as Cowie Chapel.
The chapel is at the point where the Highland Boundary Fault meets the sea and so is on the dividing line between the highlands and lowlands of Scotland.

Area history
The Chapel of St. Mary and St. Nathalan is one of the oldest surviving structures in Kincardineshire.  About one kilometre to the west is the ancient Causey Mounth trackway, which was constructed on high ground to make passable this only available medieval route from coastal points south of Stonehaven into Aberdeen. This route specifically connected the River Dee crossing (where the present Bridge of Dee is situated) via Muchalls Castle and Cowie Castle from the south. (Hogan, 2007) The route was that taken by William Keith, 7th Earl Marischal and the Marquess of Montrose when they led a Covenanter army of 9000 men in the battle of the Civil War in 1639.

See also
Doonie Point
Limpet Burn
Red Cloak

References
 Archibald Watt, Highways and Byways around Kincardineshire, Stonehaven Heritage Society (1985)
 C.Michael Hogan, Causey Mounth, Megalithic Portal, ed. by A. Burnham(2007)

Churches in Aberdeenshire
History of Aberdeenshire
Category B listed buildings in Aberdeenshire
Listed churches in Scotland
Roman Catholic chapels in Scotland
Highland Boundary Fault
Stonehaven